The Trap Door is a British animated television series, originally shown in the United Kingdom in 1986. The plot revolves around the daily lives and the misadventures of a group of monsters living in a castle. These include a blue creature called Berk, a spider-like creature called Drutt and Boni who was a skull of unknown origin. Although the emphasis was on humour and the show was marketed as a children's programme, it drew much from horror and dark fantasy. 

The show has since become a cult favourite and remains one of the most widely recognised family entertainment shows of the 1980s.

Show production
The show was created by British animators Terry Brain and Charlie Mills. It was produced through their own companies, CMTB Animation and Queensgate Productions Ltd. Brain and Mills were also responsible for another animated show, Stoppit and Tidyup, a few years later in the late 1980s, and Bump the Elephant in the 1990s. There was a stop motion movie that was in the works that was never made called The Pudding.

Together they were referred to as "Brainbox Mills". Later, Terry Brain went on to be an animator with Aardman Animations and worked on the six Wallace and Gromit films, as well as Chicken Run and animated television shows, Gogs and Creature Comforts.

A total of 25 episodes of The Trap Door were made in 1986, with each episode running for around four minutes. Years later in 1990, when the show had proved successful, another series was produced and aired with a further 15 episodes of similar running time. There was a total of 40 episodes of the show produced.

Berk, Boni and most character voices were provided by Willie Rushton, an English cartoonist, satirist, comedian, actor and performer who co-founded the satirical magazine Private Eye. Nick Shipley provided the voice of Drutt, and other characters.

The recognisable theme song of the show was written by Scottish songwriter Bob Heatlie, who also wrote the Shakin' Stevens hit Merry Christmas Everyone, and also one of the popular hits of the 1980s, Japanese Boy, sung by Aneka. The vocals were performed by Zygott. A 7" record of the extended theme song (as heard in the episode "Don't Open That Trap Door") was released, with a B-side featuring an instrumental song called "Ghost Chase", performed by The Ghost Chasers.

Intro and outro
The introduction scene of The Trap Door was a parody of many of Vincent Price's horror film introductions:

The following lines of the theme song,  thereupon commence:

Outro

Plot
The world of The Trap Door is solely inhabited by monsters, and almost all action takes place in the monsters' castle, and especially the pantry or cellar where lives Berk, the central character. Beneath the castle are a series of dark and mysterious caverns inhabited by all manner of "horrible things", accessible by the eponymous trap door.

The master of the castle, "The Thing Upstairs", resides in the attic of the castle and remains an unseen character throughout the entire show, shouting orders to Berk when hungry or annoyed. Berk has two companions, Boni and Drutt. In most episodes, Berk accidentally leaves the trap door open, admitting a more troublesome monster than himself; but some monsters open it from below. Though mostly hostile or mischievous, the monsters emergent from the trap door include the amiable and periodic Rogg, and occasionally others as harmless as he.

Episodes

Regular characters

Berk
Berk (voiced by Willie Rushton) is an oviform blue creature who speaks with a West Country accent. He is the protagonist of the show, and steward or caretaker of the monster's castle. As such, Berk often goes about his duties with simple-minded glee, and enjoys cooking with ingredients such as mud, eyeballs, snakes, and worms. Berk is often warned not to open the trap door by his friends, or forbidden by his master, but often does so nonetheless. His usual exclamations include "Oh, Globbits!" and "Sniff that!"

Boni
Boni (voiced by Willie Rushton) is a disembodied human skull, and Berk's closest friend. Speaking with an upper-class accent, he is something of an intellectual, but has a tendency to complain or bore others. Boni dislikes to be moved from his favourite spot—an alcove in the wall near the trap door—and is often shown failing to warn Berk about the various monsters that come from it. Although serious most of the time, he is given to childish excitements on par with those of Berk.

Drutt
Drutt (voiced by Nick Shipley) is Berk's pet, resembling an oversized spider, who often causes trouble when chasing after worms and other invaders, as by passing the trap door in search thereof. Although often characterised as male, Drutt produces a litter of baby spiders in the show's second season. The voice of Drutt is that of Nick Shipley, then proprietor of KPTV, who provided the editing services for the early series of Trap Door. Drutt is non-verbal but makes various noises.

The Thing Upstairs
The Thing Upstairs (voiced by Willie Rushton) is the impatient, cantankerous, demanding and terrifying master of the castle, who rarely leaves his penthouse room, and consequently is never seen. In most episodes, he orders Berk (in a Cockney accent) to fix things in the castle, prepare meals for him, or sometimes bathe or clean him. His appearance is never revealed, but grotesque hints are dropped:
 In the 14th episode of the programme's first series, "The Little Thing", a lightning flash illuminates a mass of spongy tentacles. In the same episode, Berk makes a comment about his three eyes.
 In a later episode ("Not Very Nice"), Berk loses one of the Thing's eyes, itself almost as big as Berk, down the trap door, whereafter he claims to have 'seen' the incident's events through the detached eye.
 In the 13th episode "The Pain", Berk asks which head contains a toothache, implying multiple heads, and the extracted tooth itself is a fang nearly two-thirds the size of Berk.
 In the episode "The Stupid Thing", it is mentioned that the Thing has three humps on his back, and later, that he possesses wings, which are never shown but can be heard beating.

Other characters

Trap Door monsters
For a majority of the series, the plot of each episode will revolve around a new monster that emerges from the trapdoor. These monster are often hostile to Berk and his friends, though others seem relatively harmless and simply act as a minor irritation.

The Big Red Thing
The Big Red Thing (voiced by Nick Shipley) is a recurring monster that initially appeared in the first episode "Breakfast Time", in which it emerges from the trapdoor and pursues Berk through the castle, but ultimately flees back down the trapdoor upon viewing its own reflection. The Big Red Thing makes a later appearance in the episodes "Don't Open That Trap Door", along with the final episode of the first season "Bye Bye Berk". 

Its latest appearance was the final episode of the series "The Big Red Thing", in which it attacks Rogg before exiting the castle. Berk and his colleagues watch as Rogg and The Big Red Thing battle over the horizon, where Rogg apparently dies and The Big Red Thing disappears. The monster soon reappears and roars at the group and the episode ends.

Rogg
Rogg (voiced by Willie Rushton) is a large gorilla like creature who initially appears in the fourth episode of the first series "Lurkings". Although somewhat unintelligent, he is fairly friendly towards Berk and the other residents of the castle. In the episode "Junk Food", Berk initially dislikes him after Rogg unwittingly gets him into trouble with The Thing Upstairs, the latter mistaking Rogg for a poorly prepared dinner. When confronting the Red Thing during the final episode of the second season "The Big Red Thing", Rogg is pronounced dead as the credits roll, before revealing himself to be alive in the aftermath.

Bubo
Bubo (voiced by Nick Shipley) is a recurring monster that first appears in the episode "Gourmet's Delight". In the episode, he is initially invisible until he is covered in a yellow substance. Upon catching him, Berk inflates his body through a small hole in the top of his head, before releasing him to soar back down the trapdoor. In the episode "Fester Rancid", Bubo kidnaps Boni and begins repeatedly hitting him with a stick beside a lake, before he is tossed into the water by Berk. Bubo appears for the last time in the episode "Scunge", where he returns to irritate Berk but is ultimately sent back down the trapdoor by Rogg.

The Splund
The Splund (voiced by Willie Rushton) is a large, round monster capable of teleportation. It was one of the few Trap Door creatures capable of speaking, doing so in a deep, demonic-sounding tone. It appeared in the episode "Don't open that Trap Door", often singing along to the lyrics of the theme song. In the episode "The Splund", it emerged from the Trap Door and began terrorizing Boni and Drutt by teleporting around and threatening to eat them.  Berk touched it with the point of a sewing needle, causing it to burst like a balloon and reveal that despite its intimidating manner, it was full of nothing but air.  Its voice was edited with a Harmonizer, initially deepened when it spoke, but increasing sporadically when it began laughing.

Broadcast history
In the UK, The Trap Door was originally aired during the mid-1980s on ITV in the afternoon children's programming line-up, and later went into repeats on Motormouth on Saturday mornings. Newer episodes were featured in Ghost Train, also on Saturday mornings. The show was aired again from 1996–2004 when it was broadcast by Channel 4 during early weekday mornings. It was repeated in 2004 on Nick Jr Classics, 2005 on Trouble and 2009 on POP, and it was also repeated on Channel 5.
Both seasons are currently available on iTunes and Amazon Prime Video.

Merchandise

Games
The television series spawned a video game in the mid-80s called The Trap Door and a sequel called Through The Trap Door. These games were available for the ZX Spectrum, the Amstrad CPC and the Commodore 64.

A board game was also released entitled Berk's Trapdoor Game which involved going around the board while trying to knock one's opponents over by launching one of four dice, each hidden beneath its own trapdoor, in the game board's central catapulting mechanism.

UK VHS and DVD releases
All 40 episodes were released over 4 VHS videotapes in the UK by Channel 5 Video in the 1980s.

In the 1990s, 36 episodes were re-released over 3 videos by Castle Vision (a distribution of Castle Communications plc). The missing four episodes from each of these videos were "Bye Bye Berk". "What a Weirdo", "Nasty Beasty" and "The Big Red Thing".

A rare double video-cassette released in Canada at one point contained every single episode.

All 40 episodes of The Trap Door were released on DVD by Universal Pictures in 2005.

Australian VHS releases
 Roadshow Entertainment (1999)

Reference list

External links

 
Berk's Trapdoor Game A page about the Trapdoor Board Game.

1980s British children's television series
1986 British television series debuts
1990 British television series endings
British children's animated adventure television series
British children's animated comedy television series
British children's animated fantasy television series
British children's animated horror television series
British stop-motion animated television series
British television series with live action and animation
Clay animation television series
ITV children's television shows
Television series by Universal Television